Christopher Green is an Australian paediatrician and author of parenting guide books. He works as an honorary consultant to the Children's Hospital, Westmead, in Sydney and continues to release revised editions of his books, including Toddler Taming, Beyond Toddlerdom and Understanding ADHD. He is associated with the popularisation of the 'Controlled Crying' technique, a method he claims to have invented.

Bibliography 
 Toddler Taming
 Beyond Toddlerdom
 Toddler Taming Tips
 Understanding ADHD

References 

Australian paediatricians
1948 births
Living people
Australian non-fiction writers